A want, is something that is desired.

Want or The Want may also refer to:

Arts, entertainment and media

Music 
 Want (3OH!3 album), 2008
 Want (Rufus Wainwright album), 2005
 Want (EP), by Lee Tae-min, 2019
 "Want" (Natalie Imbruglia song), 2009
 "Want!" (Berryz Kobo song), 2012
 "Want", a song by Disturbed from the 2000 album The Sickness
 "Want", a song by The Cure from the 1996 album Wild Mood Swings
 "Want", a song by Hunter Brothers from the 2019 album State of Mind
 The Want (DC band), a rock band
 The Want (New Jersey band), a stoner/blues rock band

Other uses in arts, entertainment and media 
 The Want (short film), by Stephen Saux and Lori Murphy Saux, 2019
 Want, a character in Charles Dickens's A Christmas Carol
 WANT, an FM radio station in Lebanon, Tennessee, U.S.
 "Want", an episode of Law & Order: Criminal Intent (season 4)

Other uses
 Becky Want (born 1961), an English radio presenter
 Richard Want (fl. 1692–1696), a pirate active in the Indian Ocean
Incentive salience, a cognitive process that confers a "desire" or "want" attribute

See also 
 
 Desire (disambiguation)
 Wanted (disambiguation)
 Wanting (disambiguation)
 Want Want, a Chinese food manufacturer